Charles Stewart, 7th Earl of Traquair,  (1746–1827) was an 18/19th century Scottish landowner.

Life
He was born at Traquair House near Peebles in August 1744, the only son of John Stewart, 6th Earl of Traquair. In 1779, following the death of his father, he inherited Traquair House and became the 7th Earl of Traquair.

In 1798 he was elected a Fellow of the Royal Society of Edinburgh. His proposers were Joseph Black, Dugald Stewart, and Alexander Keith of Dunnottar. He died at Traquair on 14 October 1827.

Family
In August 1773 he married Mary Ravenscroft (d.1796), second daughter of George Ravenscoft of Wykeham Hall in Lincolnshire. Their children were Charles Stewart, 8th Earl of Traquair (1781-1861), and the Hon Louisa Stewart (1776-1875).

References

1746 births
1827 deaths
Fellows of the Royal Society of Edinburgh
Fellows of the Society of Antiquaries of Scotland
Earls in the Peerage of Scotland